Coishco District is one of nine districts of the Santa Province in Peru.

References

Districts of the Santa Province
Districts of the Ancash Region